Akbar Khan (born 7 July 1949) is an Indian actor, screenwriter, producer and director. He is the youngest brother of the Indian actor, producer, editor and director, Feroz Khan and Sanjay Khan.

Early life
Akbar was born on July 7, 1949, in Bangalore, India, to Sadiq Ali Khan Tanoli and Fatima. His father was an Afghan from Ghazni, Afghanistan and belonged to Tanoli people which is a Pashtun tribe, while his mother had Persian ancestry from Iran] His brothers are the legendary actor-filmmaker Feroz Khan, actor-filmmaker Sanjay Khan, Sameer Khan and Shahruq Khan. His sisters are Dilshad and Khurshid.

Khan was educated at Bishop Cotton Boys' School and St. Germain High School, both in Bangalore.

Career 
Akbar started his career as an assistant director to some filmmakers and after some years of assisting made his debut in Anjaan Rahain (1974), which starred his brother Feroz in the main lead. He was also assistant director to his brother Feroz in Apradh (1972). After acting in a couple of films, Akbar turned producer-director with Haadsa (1983), starring himself in the lead. He also starred in his brother Sanjay Khan's directorial venture Kala Dhanda Gorey Log (1986). After acting in Aakarshan (1988), Akbar turned his attention to the TV industry and directed the first 15 episodes of his brother Sanjay Khan's epic TV Serial, The Sword of Tipu Sultan.

Akbar produced-directed and also played the title role of Emperor Akbar in the classic TV serial Akbar The Great. In 2005, Akbar produced-directed the magnum opus Taj Mahal: An Eternal Love Story. He also launched Pakistani legend actress-singer Noor Jehan's granddaughter Sonya Jehan in the film, which also starred Kabir Bedi, Zulfi Syed, Arbaaz Khan and Pooja Batra. It was the costliest film made in India at that time, with a budget of INR 60 crores. It was also the first Indian film to release in Pakistani cinemas, as Indian films were banned there since the Indo-Pak war of 1965. Akbar, along with his family and other Indian film stars also visited Pakistan in April 2006 and actively promoted the film. The film was badly sabotaged and ill-marketed in India by Mukta Arts, which led to a dispute between Akbar, Subhash Ghai and Yash Chopra. The film was highly appreciated at nearly all international film festivals. Akbar plans to re-release the film in India and abroad very soon, as many people didn't know that it actually released in 2005. Akbar starred in Vashu Bhagnani's Faltu (2011) and played the main lead in Faraar (2011).

He is into the petrochemical business with his company Abraiz Petrochemicals. Akbar also has some business interests in Iran. He lives at Oberoi Enclave in Juhu, Mumbai near his late brother Feroz's bungalow.

Filmography

Actor

Director

Movie

Television

References

External links 
 Akbar Khan at imdb
 "Akbar Khan to be sued for using animals in Taj Mahal", By IndiaFM

Indian male film actors
Film directors from Mumbai
Indian male screenwriters
Film producers from Mumbai
Indian Shia Muslims
Living people
Indian people of Afghan descent
Indian people of Iranian descent
20th-century Indian male actors
Male actors from Mumbai
Male actors in Hindi cinema
1949 births